Stenorrhina degenhardtii, also known by its common name Degenhardt's scorpion-eating snake, is a species of snake in the family Colubridae. The species is native to southeastern Mexico, Central America, and northwestern South America. There are three recognized subspecies.

Etymology
The specific name, degenhardtii, is in honor of a German named Degenhardt who collected amphibians and reptiles in northern South America in the 1840s.

Geographic range
S. degenhardtii is found in the Mexican states of Chiapas, Oaxaca, and Veracruz; in the Central American countries of Belize, Costa Rica, Guatemala, Honduras, Nicaragua, and Panama; and in the South American countries of Colombia, Ecuador, Peru, and Venezuela.

Habitat

Description

Behavior
S. degenhardtii is diurnal and terrestrial.

Diet
S. degenhardtii preys predominately upon scorpions and spiders, but also eats crickets, grasshoppers, and insect larvae.

Reproduction
S. degenhardtii is oviparous. Clutch size is 11–12 eggs.

Subspecies
Three subspecies are recognized as being valid, including the nominotypical subspecies.
Stenorrhina degenhardtii degenhardtii 
Stenorrhina degenhardtii mexicana 
Stenorrhina degenhardtii ocellata

References

Further reading
Boulenger GA (1896). Catalogue of the Snakes in the British Museum (Natural History). Volume III., Containing the Colubridæ (Opisthoglyphæ and Proteroglyphæ) .... London: Trustees of the British Museum (Natural History). (Taylor and Francis, printers). xiv + 727 pp. + Plates I–XXV. (Stenorrhina degenhardti, pp. 229–231).
Freiberg M (1982). Snakes of South America. Hong Kong: T.F.H. Publications. 189 pp. . (Stenorrhina degenhardti, p. 111).
Heimes P (2016). Snakes of Mexico: Herpetofauna Mexicana Vol. I. Frankfurt, Germany: Chimaira. 572 pp. .

Colubrids
Reptiles described in 1846